Møgster is a surname. Notable people with the surname include:
 Halvor Møgster (1875–1950), Norwegian sailor
 Ole Rasmus Møgster (1958–2010), Norwegian businessman
  (1883–1975), Norwegian resistance fighter

Norwegian-language surnames